Jean Maissant (23 January 1926 – 7 November 2020) was a French athlete. He competed in the men's discus throw at the 1952 Summer Olympics.

References

External links
 

1926 births
2020 deaths
Athletes (track and field) at the 1952 Summer Olympics
French male discus throwers
Olympic athletes of France
Place of birth missing